Papilio sataspes is a species of swallowtail butterfly from the genus Papilio that is found in Sulawesi and Banggai.

Subspecies
Papilio sataspes sataspes (Sulawesi)
Papilio sataspes artaphernes Honrath, 1886 (Bangkai Island)

Taxonomy
Papilio sataspes is a member of the helenus species-group. The members of this clade are
Papilio helenus Linnaeus, 1758 
Papilio iswara White, 1842
Papilio iswaroides Fruhstorfer, 1898
Papilio nephelus Boisduval, 1836
Papilio nubilus Staudinger, 1895
Papilio sataspes C. & R. Felder, 1865

Protection
Protected in Bantimurung – Bulusaraung National Park.

References

sataspes
Butterflies described in 1865
Butterflies of Indonesia
Taxa named by Baron Cajetan von Felder
Taxa named by Rudolf Felder